The S-IB stage was the first stage of the Saturn IB launch vehicle, which was used for Earth orbital missions. It was an upgraded version of the S-I stage used on the earlier Saturn I rocket and was composed of nine propellant containers, eight fins, a thrust structure assembly, eight H-1 rocket engines, and many other components. It also contained the ODOP transponder. The propellant containers consisted of eight Redstone-derived tanks (four holding liquid oxygen (LOX) and four holding RP-1) clustered around a Jupiter rocket-derived tank containing LOX. The four outboard engines gimballed to steer the rocket in flight, which required a few more engine components.

Specifications
Height: 
Diameter: 
Number of fins: 8
Finspan: 
Engines: 8 Rocketdyne H-1
Thrust: 
Fuel: RP-1 (Refined kerosene) 41,000 US gal (155 m3)
Oxidizer: Liquid oxygen (LOX) 66,277 US gal (251 m3) nominal capacity including 1.5% ullage volume (43,284 US gal / 163 m3 in four outer tanks plus 22,993 US gal / 87 m3 in center tank)
Burn time: 2.5 min
Burnout altitude:

References

Rocket stages